Eremophila sargentii is a flowering plant in the figwort family, Scrophulariaceae and is endemic to Western Australia. It is a shrub with sticky, shiny foliage, small leaves and mauve or blue flowers.

Description
Its branches are glabrous, shiny and sticky and have ridges extending down from the leaf bases.

The petal tube is mauve, blue or lilac-coloured, white with yellow-brown spots inside. The petal tube and lobes are glabrous except for the inside of the tube which has long, soft hairs. The 4 stamens are enclosed in the petal tube.

Taxonomy and naming 
The species was first formally described in 1921 by Spencer Le Marchant Moore who gave it the name Pholidia sargentii and published the description in Journal of Botany, British and Foreign. In 1981, Robert Chinnock changed the name to Eremophila sargentii and published the new name in Journal of the Adelaide Botanic Garden. The specific epithet (sargentii) honours Oswald Hewlett Sargent, a pharmacist and botanist from York, who described nine species of plants.

Distribution and habitat 
This eremophila grows in sandy loam and laterite between Wongan Hills and Kalannie in the Avon Wheatbelt biogeographic region.

Conservation
E. sargentii is classified as "Priority Two" by the Western Australian Government Department of Parks and Wildlife meaning that is poorly known and from only one or a few locations.

Use in horticulture
This is a very hardy shrub, usually with deep blue flowers that contrast well with its bright green, often aromatic leaves. It is usually propagated from cuttings and grows well in a wide range of soils including those that are alkaline or clay-based. It is both drought and frost hardy and does not usually require watering, even during a long dry spell.

References

Eudicots of Western Australia
sargentii
Endemic flora of Western Australia
Plants described in 1921
 Taxa named by Spencer Le Marchant Moore